Gibbon's Cave is a cave in the British Overseas Territory of Gibraltar. Gibbon's Cave is at the southern end of the Upper Rock Nature Reserve just to the west of Tina's Fissure, George's Bottom Cave and Levant Cave which are a close group of three caves.

The "Levant series of caves" consists of Levant Cave, George's Bottom Cave, and Gibbon's Cave.

See also
List of caves in Gibraltar

References

Caves of Gibraltar